Batal Samsonovich Kobakhia (born 18 August 1955, Sukhumi, Georgia) is an Abkhaz archaeologist and public figure; The deputy of 4th convocation (2007-2012), chairman of the committee for Human Rights and Rule of Law.

References

1955 births
Living people
Abkhazian politicians
Archaeologists from Georgia (country)
People from Sukhumi